The Melbourne Baseball Club, nicknamed the Demons, is a baseball club based in the inner Melbourne suburb of Box Hill. The club is part of the MCC and is affiliated as the Baseball Section of the MCC.

Having been established as the baseball section of the MCC in 1888, it is one of the oldest baseball clubs in Australia.

History 
The club had been involved in baseball since 1857, when a group of cricket enthusiasts played a game held in the Carlton Gardens. By the 1860s S.P. Lord led several attempts to organise baseball in Melbourne, although the game never progressed beyond games in the Carlton Gardens.

The 1876 Philadelphia Centennial Exhibition showed that the United States was on the road to become an economic world power and baseball could be a crucial link between the US and the new colony. From then on, American influence became more pronounced. The Melbourne International Exhibition (1880) caught the attention of several foreign observers who realised that Melbourne looked like an "American-style" city.

In October 1885, members of the Melbourne Cricket Club played the officers of the US Enterprise which were the first ever played at the Melbourne Cricket Ground. The American won 23–17 but they could watch the progress of the Australians in the sport. To commemorate the United States Declaration of Independence in 1887, the American Baseball Club established in Melbourne played a team captained by H.F. Boyle of the MCC, being defeated.

The MCC committee continued to support the expansion of local interest in baseball. In 1888 they resolved to form a team and arrange exhibition games as a preparation for a visit to the US. The MCC played the MBC who were American expatriated mostly. The game, played in Albert Park, saw MCC to win 35–29.

The matches against the resident Americans became a regular practise during those times.

See also
 Melbourne Cricket Club

References

External links
Official website

Australian baseball clubs
Baseball teams in Melbourne
1888 establishments in Australia
Baseball teams established in 1888
Sport in the City of Whitehorse